William John Murphy (born January 4, 1963) is an American attorney and was a Democratic member of the Rhode Island House of Representatives, representing the 26th District from 1993 to 2011. He served as the 221st Speaker of the House from January 7, 2003 to February 11, 2010, when he handed over the gavel to his majority leader, Gordon D. Fox.

Education
He graduated from the University of Hartford with a Bachelor of Arts in Politics and Government in 1985 and from the University of New Hampshire School of Law with a Juris Doctor in 1989.

Legal career
He has practiced law in Providence, Rhode Island with his own law firm Murphy & Fay, LLP.

Political career
He served in the Rhode Island House of Representatives representing the 26th District from 1993 to 2011. While in this position he served as Vice Chairman of the House Judiciary Committee and later Speaker of the House.

He later registered as a lobbyist and has lobbied in both the Rhode Island General Assembly and the Office of the Governor of Rhode Island for groups such as Twin Rivers Casino, the Rhode Island Brotherhood of Correctional Officers and Advance America Cash Advance Centers.

Personal life
He married his wife Stacey on March 26, 1994 at Sacred Heart Church in West Warwick, Rhode Island. They later had two children.

References

External links
Archive of Rhode Island House Representative William J. Murphy Profile
Profile at Project Vote Smart
Follow the Money - William J. Murphy
2006 2004 20021998 1996 1994 campaign contributions
 Archive of article about his plan to step down as Speaker of the House

Speakers of the Rhode Island House of Representatives
Democratic Party members of the Rhode Island House of Representatives
1963 births
Living people
University of Hartford alumni
University of New Hampshire School of Law alumni
Politicians from Warwick, Rhode Island
People from West Warwick, Rhode Island
Rhode Island lawyers